The Orange County Courthouse is located on Courthouse Square in Paoli, Indiana at the intersection of State Roads 37, 56 and US Highway 150.

The courthouse is one of the two oldest courthouses in Indiana that have been used continuously, the other being in Rising Sun, Indiana (Ohio County). The Orange County Courthouse was built 1847–1850. It is a good example of the Greek Revival style of architecture. The courthouse is distinguished by a Doric portico with six fluted columns.

It was listed on the National Register of Historic Places in 1975.

References

Further reading
The Magnificent 92 Indiana Courthouses by Will Counts and Jon Dilts, copyright 1991, pages 124,125.
Historic American Buildings Survey in Indiana edited by Thomas M Slade, copyright 1983, pages 91–93

External links
Orange County, Indiana
Preserve Indiana

County courthouses in Indiana
Clock towers in Indiana
Historic American Buildings Survey in Indiana
Courthouses on the National Register of Historic Places in Indiana
Government buildings completed in 1850
Greek Revival architecture in Indiana
Buildings and structures in Orange County, Indiana
National Register of Historic Places in Orange County, Indiana
Individually listed contributing properties to historic districts on the National Register in Indiana